Hideaki Yamazaki (	山崎 秀晃, born February 5, 1987) is a Japanese Shotokan kickboxer, currently competing in the super lightweight division of K-1. A professional competitor since 2009, Yamazaki is the former Krush Lightweight and Krush Super Lightweight champion, as well as the former K-1 Super Lightweight champion. He also won the Krush -63 kg WILDRUSH League in 2012. 

As of February 2021, he is the #3 ranked featherweight according to Combat Press. He's been ranked as a top ten featherweight since October 2020. He was previously ranked in the featherweight top ten by Combat Press between April 2016 and May 2018. He was ranked in the featherweight top ten by LiverKick.com.

Kickboxing career

Lightweight

Early career
Yamazaki made his professional debut against Yuichiro Kono at J-NETWORK J-FIGHT 27. He won the fight by unanimous decision. He went on to win six of his next seven fights, drawing once against Shuhei Morikawa. He suffered his first professional loss to TaCa at Krush-EX 2011 vol.2, losing by TKO in the third round.

Yamazaki rebounded by winning his next eight fights, including a trilogy with Taca. The winning streak ended when he was scheduled to fight Gagny Baradji at Krush 25, with Baradji knocking Yamazaki out with a right hook in the second round.

Krush Lightweight title reign
His stellar streak earned him the chance to fight Thomas Adamandopoulos for the Krush Lightweight title at Krush 27 on March 20, 2013. He won the fight by unanimous decision. After defeating Ikki and Luke Turner, he was scheduled to fight Minoru Kimura in his first title defense. Yamazaki knocked Kimura out after just 47 seconds, with an overhand right. After winning another non-tile bout against Mohamed Galaoui by technical knockout, he was scheduled to defend his title for the second time against Mohamed Boulef at Krush 42 on June 12, 2014. Yamazaki won the fight by a second-round technical knockout.

In November 2014, Hideaki Yamazaki made his highly anticipated debut with K-1, fighting in the quarter finals of the K-1 World GP 2014 -65kg Championship Tournament. He lost a unanimous decision against the future champion Kaew Fairtex.

Returning to Krush, he was booked to face Joan Manuel Lique Cañaveral, in his third title defense, at Krush 55 on June 12, 2015. He defeated Cañaveral by unanimous decision. He was then scheduled to fight Masaaki Noiri at Krush 57 in a non-title fight. The fight went into an extra round, after which Noiri won a decision. It was Yamazaki's first loss in Krush in nearly three years.

Super lightweight

Krush Super Lightweight title reign
Abandoning his Lightweight title, Yamazaki went up in weight to fight NOMAN for the Krush Super Lightweight title. The title bout took place at Krush 60 on November 14, 2015. He won the fight by technical knockout in the second round, after the referee was forced to wave the fight off following an undefended flurry of punches from Yamazaki.

Yamazaki was then booked to take part in the 2016 K-1 Japan Super Lightweight Grand Prix. In the quarterfinal, Yamazaki beat Yasuomi Soda by an uppercut knockout in the second round. Advancing to the semifinals, he defeated Yuta Kubo by a third-round technical knockout, after he had dropped him twice in the round. This resulted in a stoppage victory for Yamazaki, under the K-1 tournament rules. In the tournament final, he fought a rematch with Masaaki Noiri, whom he defeated by majority decision.

Yamazaki took part in the 2016 K-1 World Super Lightweight Grand Prix as well. Despite a successful start to the one-day tournament, which saw him win a unanimous decision against Stanislav Reniţă, he lost a split decision to Ilias Bulaid in the penultimate bout of the Grand Prix.

Yamazaki next faced Gonnapar Weerasakreck at K-1 World GP 2016 -60kg World Tournament on September 19, 2016. He lost the fight by unanimous decision. Despite suffering back-to-back losses, Yamazaki was given a chance to fight Kaew Fairtex for the K-1 Super Lightweight title at K-1 World GP 2017 Super Bantamweight Championship Tournament on April 22, 2017. Kaew won the fight by unanimous decision.

After his failed title shot, Yamazaki fought and beat Jun Nakazawa in June 2018, winning by unanimous decision. He lost his next fight against Rukiya Anpo, after the fight went into an extra round, during which Anpo knocked Yamazaki out with a head kick. After this loss, he went on a four fight winning streak, defeating Jin Hirayama by decision and knocking out Ruku, Tsubasa Horii and Hikaru Terashima.

K-1 Super Lightweight champion
During the 2020 K-1 World GP in Osaka, held on September 22, 2020, Yamazaki fought Rukiya Anpo for the K-1 Super Lightweight title. He won the fight by a first-round left hook knockout.

Yamazaki was booked to fight Fukashi Mizutani in a non-title bout at K-1: K’Festa 4 on March 21, 2021. He beat Fukashi by knockout, 70 seconds into the fight.

Yamazaki made his first K-1 super lightweight title defense against Tetsuya Yamato at K-1: K'Festa 5 on April 3, 2022. Yamazaki lost his title by first round knockout when Yamato landed a left hook only 50 seconds into the bout.

Later super lightweight career
Yamazaki faced the 2019 RISE Lightweight champion Kento Haraguchi at The Match 2022 on June 19, 2022. He lost the fight by a second-round technical knockout, after suffering two knockdowns in the opening round.

Titles and accomplishments

Kickboxing
K-1
 2016 K-1 World GP 2016 -65kg Japan Tournament Winner
 2020 K-1 Super Lightweight Championship

Krush
2009 GAORA Krush Lightweight WILDRUSH League Winner
2013 Krush Lightweight Championship 
Three successful title defenses
2015 Krush Super Lightweight Championship

Amateur
2006 JAPAN GAME Tournament 
2006 1st Dragon Cup Tournament Winner -64kg

Awards
 2018 K-1 Awards Fight of the Year (vs Rukiya Anpo)
 2020 K-1 Awards Fight of the Year (vs Rukiya Anpo)
4x eFight "Fighter of the Month" (March 2013, June 2014 and March 2016, September 2020)

Karate
2006 Tsukishinkai 8th Osaka Karate Tournament Winner
2008 Shin Karate 102nd K-2 Lightweight Tournament Winner
2009 Shin Karate 104th K-2 Lightweight Tournament Winner
2009 Shin Karate 20th All Japan Championship Lightweight 3rd place

Kickboxing record

|-  style="text-align:center; background:#fbb"
| 2022-06-19 || Loss ||align=left| Kento Haraguchi || THE MATCH 2022 || Tokyo, Japan || TKO (Referee stoppage/punches) || 2 ||0:33
|- style="background:#fbb" 
| 2022-04-03 || Loss||align=left| Tetsuya Yamato || K-1: K'Festa 5 || Tokyo, Japan || KO (Left hook) || 1 || 0:50
|-
! style=background:white colspan=9 |
|-  style="background:#cfc;"
| 2021-03-21|| Win || align=left| Fukashi Mizutani || K-1: K'Festa 4 Day 1 || Tokyo, Japan || KO (Left Jab)||1 || 1:10
|-  style="background:#cfc;"
| 2020-09-22|| Win || align=left| Rukiya Anpo || K-1 World GP 2020 in Osaka|| Osaka, Japan || KO (Left Hook) || 1||1:18
|-
! style=background:white colspan=9 |
|-  style="background:#cfc;"
| 2020-03-22|| Win ||align=left| Hikaru Terashima || K-1: K’Festa 3 || Saitama, Japan || KO (Punches) ||2 ||2:59
|-  style="background:#cfc;"
| 2020-01-25|| Win ||align=left| Tsubasa Horii || Krush 110 || Tokyo, Japan || KO (3 Knockdowns)|| 1 || 2:28
|-  style="background:#CCFFCC;"
| 2019-11-24 || Win|| align=left| Ruku||  K-1 World GP 2019 Yokohamatsuri  || Yokohama, Japan || KO (3 Knockdowns)|| 1 || 1:24 
|-
|- style="background:#CCFFCC;"
| 2019-08-24|| Win ||align=left| Jin Hirayama || K-1 World GP 2019: Japan vs World 5 vs 5 & Special Superfight in Osaka  || Osaka, Japan || Decision (Unanimous) || 3 || 3:00
|-  style="background:#Fbb;"
| 2018-12-08|| Loss|| align=left|  Rukiya Anpo || K-1 World GP 2018: K-1 Lightweight World's Strongest Tournament || Osaka, Japan || Ext.R TKO (High Kick) || 4 || 0:13
|-  bgcolor="#CCFFCC"
| 2018-06-17 || Win || align=left| Jun Nakazawa || K-1 World GP 2018: 2nd Featherweight Championship Tournament || Saitama, Japan || Decision (Unanimous) || 3 || 3:00
|-  
|-  style="background:#Fbb;"
| 2017-04-22 || Loss || align=left| Kaew Fairtex || K-1 World GP 2017 Super Bantamweight Championship Tournament || Tokyo, Japan || Decision (Unanimous) || 3 || 3:00
|-
! style=background:white colspan=9 |
|- 
|-  style="background:#Fbb;"
| 2016-09-19 || Loss ||align=left| Gonnapar Weerasakreck  || K-1 World GP 2016 -60kg World Tournament || Tokyo, Japan ||Decision (Unanimous) || 3 || 3:00
|-  
|-  style="background:#Fbb;"
| 2016-06-24 || Loss|| align=left| Ilias Bulaid || K-1 World GP 2016 -65kg World Tournament, Semi Finals || Tokyo, Japan || Ext.R Decision (Split) || 4 || 3:00
|-  
|-  bgcolor="#CCFFCC"
| 2016-06-24 || Win || align=left| Stanislav Reniţă || K-1 World GP 2016 -65kg World Tournament, Quarter Finals || Tokyo, Japan || Decision (Unanimous) || 3 || 3:00
|-  style="background:#cfc;"
| 2016-03-04 || Win||align=left| Masaaki Noiri || K-1 World GP 2016 -65kg Japan Tournament, Final || Tokyo, Japan || Decision  (majority) || 3 || 3:00 
|-
! style=background:white colspan=9 |
|-  style="background:#cfc;"
| 2016-03-04 || Win||align=left| Yuta Kubo || K-1 World GP 2016 -65kg Japan Tournament, Semi Finals || Tokyo, Japan || KO (2 Knockdowns) || 3 || 2:57
|-  style="background:#cfc;"
| 2016-03-04 || Win||align=left| Yasuomi Soda || K-1 World GP 2016 -65kg Japan Tournament, Quarter Finals || Tokyo, Japan || KO (Uppercut + Left Hook) || 2 || 0:32
|-  style="background:#cfc;"
| 2015-11-14|| Win||align=left| NOMAN || Krush 60 || Japan || TKO(Referee Stoppage) || 2 || 0:54 
|-
! style=background:white colspan=9 |
|-  style="background:#Fbb;"
| 2015-08-22|| Loss||align=left| Masaaki Noiri || Krush 57 in NAGOYA || Nagoya, Japan || Ext.R Decision (Unanimous) || 4 || 3:00
|-  style="background:#cfc;"
| 2015-06-12|| Win||align=left| Joan Manuel Lique Cañaveral|| Krush 55|| Japan || Decision (Unanimous) || 3 || 3:00 
|-
! style=background:white colspan=9 |
|-  style="background:#Fbb;"
| 2014-11-03 || Loss|| align=left| Kaew Fairtex || K-1 World GP 2014 -65kg Championship Tournament, Quarter Finals || Shibuya, Tokyo, Japan || Decision (Unanimous) || 3 || 3:00
|-  style="background:#cfc;"
| 2014-06-12|| Win||align=left| Mohamed Boulef|| Krush 42|| Japan || TKO (Left Hooks) || 3 || 2:00 
|-
! style=background:white colspan=9 |
|-  style="background:#cfc;"
| 2014-02-14|| Win||align=left| Mohamed Galaoui|| Krush.38|| Japan || KO (Left Hooks) ||2 || 2:20
|-  style="background:#cfc;"
| 2013-12-14 || Win|| align=left| Minoru Kimura || Krush.35 || Tokyo, Japan || KO (Overhand Right) || 1 || 0:47
|-
! style=background:white colspan=9 |
|-  style="background:#cfc;"
| 2013-09-21 || Win|| align=left| Luke Turner || Krush.33 || Tokyo, Japan || KO (Right Hook) || 1 || 1:28
|-  style="background:#cfc;"
| 2013-06-16|| Win|| align=left| Ikki|| Krush.29|| Tokyo, Japan || Decision (Unanimous) || 3 || 3:00
|-  style="background:#cfc;"
| 2013-03-20|| Win|| align=left| Thomas Adamandopoulos|| Krush.27|| Tokyo, Japan || Decision (Unanimous) || 3 || 3:00
|-
! style=background:white colspan=9 |
|-  style="background:#Fbb;"
| 2012-12-14 || Loss|| align=left| Gagny Baradji || Krush.25 TEAM DRAGON 10th Anniversary ||  Japan || KO (Right Hook) || 2 || 0:58
|-  style="background:#cfc;"
| 2012-10-08|| Win|| align=left| Takahashi Yukimitsu|| Krush.23|| Tokyo, Japan || Decision (Majority) || 3 || 3:00
|-
! style=background:white colspan=9 |
|-  style="background:#cfc;"
| 2012-07-21|| Win|| align=left| Terasaki Naoki|| Krush.20|| Tokyo, Japan || KO (Left Hook) || 1 || 0:24
|-  style="background:#cfc;"
| 2012-03-17|| Win|| align=left| Taca|| Krush.17|| Tokyo, Japan || Decision (Unanimous) || 3|| 3:00
|-  style="background:#cfc;"
| 2012-01-09|| Win|| align=left| Tsukakoshi Hitoshi || Krush.15|| Tokyo, Japan || Decision (Unanimous) || 3|| 3:00
|-  style="background:#cfc;"
| 2011-11-12|| Win|| align=left| Hayato Hatakeyama || Krush.13|| Tokyo, Japan || KO (Right Hook) || 1|| 2:59
|-  style="background:#cfc;"
| 2011-09-24|| Win|| align=left| Chen Minmin || Krush.12 Krush vs China "The Legend of Heroes"|| Tokyo, Japan || KO (Right Knee) || 2|| 0:56
|-  style="background:#cfc;"
| 2011-07-16|| Win|| align=left| NOMAN || Krush-70 kg Founder Championship Tournament|| Tokyo, Japan || Decision (Unanimous) || 3|| 3:00
|-  style="background:#cfc;"
| 2011-04-30|| Win|| align=left| Yuki Yamamoto|| Krush founder championship tournament || Tokyo, Japan || KO (Right Hook) || 1|| 1:11
|-  style="background:#Fbb;"
| 2011-02-13 || Loss|| align=left| TaCa || Krush-EX 2011 vol.2 ||  Japan || TKO (Towel throw) || 3 || 1:29
|-  style="background:#cfc;"
| 2010-10-31|| Win|| align=left| TaCa || Krush-EX Road to the Championship ||  Japan || KO (3 Knockdowns) || 1 || 2:59
|-  style="background:#cfc;"
| 2010-09-20|| Win|| align=left| Osamu Maeda|| Krush.10||  Japan || KO (Straight RIght) || 1 || 0:41
|-  style="background:#cfc;"
| 2010-07-09|| Win|| align=left| Daisuke Endo|| Krush.8||  Japan || Decision (Unanimous) || 3 || 3:00
|-  style="background:#cfc;"
| 2010-05-27|| Win|| align=left| Isao Takahashi|| Krush.7||  Japan || KO (Right High Kick) || 1 || 1:29
|-  style="background:#cfc;"
| 2010-03-13|| Win|| align=left| Tsukasa Fuji|| Krush×Survivor||  Japan || Decision (Unanimous) || 3 || 3:00
|-  style="background:#c5d2ea;" 
| 2009-12-04|| Draw ||align=left| Shuhei Morikawa || Krush-EX  Shinjuku Dog Fight  || Japan ||  Decision || 3 || 3:00
|-  style="background:#cfc;"
| 2009-09-13|| Win|| align=left| Janjira Katsu || J-NETWORK J-FIGHT 30||  Japan || Decision (Unanimous) || 3 || 3:00
|-  style="background:#cfc;"
| 2009-06-14|| Win|| align=left| Yuichiro Kono || J-NETWORK J-FIGHT 27||  Japan || Decision (Unanimous) || 3 || 3:00
|-
| colspan=9 | Legend:

See also
 List of male kickboxers

References

Living people
1987 births
Japanese male kickboxers
Japanese male karateka
Shotokan practitioners
Sportspeople from Kyoto
Featherweight kickboxers